J. S. Harry or Jan Harry (4 January 1939 – 20 May 2015) was an Australian poet described as "one of Australian poetry’s keenest satirists, political and social commentators, and perhaps its most ethical agent and antagonist."

J. S. Harry was born in South Australia, but soon moved to Sydney, where she remained. She worked as an editor for Radio National and held a residency at Australian National University. A recurrent character in her work was Peter Henry Lepus, a rabbit who name-drops philosophers such as Bertrand Russell, Ludwig Wittgenstein and A. J. Ayer while popping up in the midst of topical events such as the Gulf War. His satirical "clear-eyed vision of the world, and the humans that inhabit it, is that of an Everyrabbit, with its endless simplicity, trepidation and curiosity."

Among other accolades J. S. Harry won the Harri Jones Memorial Prize for Poetry, the Poetry Society's Book of the Year, the PEN International Lyne Phillips Poetry Prize and the Kenneth Slessor Prize for Poetry. Her recent works include Not Finding Wittgenstein (2007) a 'collected works' of Peter Henry Lepus and Public Private (2013). Posthumous publication of the last adventure of Peter Henry is anticipated (Giramondo Publishing).

Works

Poetry
 The Deer Under the Skin (1971)
 Hold for a Little While, and Turn Gently (1979)
 A Dandelion for Van Gogh (1985)
 The Life on the Water and the Life Beneath (Sydney: Angus & Robertson/Paperbark, 1995) 
 Selected Poems (Ringwood, Vic.: Penguin, 1995) 
 Sun Shadow, Moon Shadow (Sydney: Vagabond, 2000) 
 Not Finding Wittgenstein (Giramondo, 2007) 
Public Private (Sydney: Vagabond, 2013) 
J.S. Harry: New and Selected Poems (Giramondo, 2021)

References

External links 
 18 poems with Spanish & Italian translations
 J.S. Harry  Poems & analysis at Poetry International Web
 Journeys Digital — & ‘Other’ Worlds, by J.S. Harry Includes mp3 author reading & animations
 Unfaithfully Yours: Lines from the Index at the Australian Book Review

1939 births
2015 deaths
Writers from Sydney
Writers from South Australia
Australian women poets
20th-century Australian poets
20th-century Australian women writers